is a Taiwanese–Japanese voice actress from Fukushima Prefecture. She was affiliated with the agency Swallow and turned into freelancer on 2022 November. She made her voice acting debut in 2017, playing her first major role as Momo Minamoto in the anime series Release the Spyce in 2018.

Biography and career 
Anzai spent part of her childhood in Taiwan. She grew up watching anime series like Cardcaptor Sakura and Super Doll Licca-chan, as well as being exposed to the Zoids franchise through her brother. She took an interest in voice acting while in elementary school when, as part of a class presentation, she had a part in a historical play. So she could familiarize herself with the voice acting profession, her brother loaned her a DVD of the series Magical Girl Lyrical Nanoha A's, and she was influenced by the acting and singing of voice actress Nana Mizuki. Watching the series motivated Anzai to pursue a voice acting career. To hone skills, she also listened to roles voiced by Sanae Kobayashi, Aoi Yūki, and Kana Hanazawa. She also spent eight months studying abroad in New Zealand.

Anzai debuted in 2017 after graduating from Pony Canyon's P's Voice Artist School. She started out playing minor roles in the anime series Clean Freak! Aoyama kun, Angel's 3Piece!, and Love and Lies. The following year, she was cast in her first major role, as Momo Minamoto, the protagonist of the anime series Release the Spyce. She, along with the series's other major characters, also performed the show's opening and ending ("Hide & Seek") theme songs under the group-name Tsukikage. While promoting Release the Spyce, she appeared at C3 AFA Jakarta 2018, the last to be held in Indonesia. In October 2018, as part of promotions for the Onsen Musume multimedia franchise, she was named a Japanese ambassador for the hot springs of Hsinchu County, Taiwan. That same year, she was cast as Tiara in the mixed-media project Lapis Re:Lights. In 2019, she played the role of Miharu Yomine in the mobile game Cue!, which she reprised in its anime adaptation.

Filmography

Anime
2017
Clean Freak! Aoyama kun as Reona Baba, Furukawa, Schoolgirl, Girl
Angel's 3Piece! as Isurugi, Elementary Schoolgirl
Love and Lies as Schoolgirl

2018
Ultra Monsters Anthropomorphic Project as Woman
Duel Masters as Breaking Dance Churis, Eyeball Doctor, Hakase Toyama
Magical Girl Site as Yuka Sumikura
Layton Mystery Tanteisha: Katori no Nazotoki File as Customer A
Happy Sugar Life as Minori Kitaumekawa
Release the Spyce as Momo Minamoto

2019
The Quintessential Quintuplets as Announcement, Eba
Rinshi!! Ekoda-chan as Customer A
Hitori Bocchi no Marumaru Seikatsu as Junior High Schoolgirl B

2020
Lapis Re:Lights as Tiara

2021
Fairy Ranmaru as Schoolgirl 1, Fan 1, Idol A, Boys

2022
Cue! as Miharu Yomine

2023
Ippon Again! as Sanae Takigawa

Video games
2018
Lapis Re:Lights as Tiara
Onsen Musume as Neiwan Jianshih
2019
Cue! as Miharu Yomine
Magia Record as Temari Kira
2021
The Idolmaster Cinderella Girls as Kotoka Saionji

References

External links 
 Official agency profile 
 

Living people
Japanese people of Taiwanese descent
Japanese video game actresses
Japanese voice actresses
Voice actresses from Fukushima Prefecture
Year of birth missing (living people)